Silarpur is a village located on Mahendragarh - Ateli road on a distance of 6 km from Ateli. Neighbouring villages include Katkai, Duloth Jat, Bhodi, Mohanpur. 

Villages in Mahendragarh district